Leicestershire 2 was a tier 11 English Rugby Union league with teams from Leicestershire taking part.  Promoted teams moved up to Leicestershire 1 and there was no relegation.  The league ran for two spells between 1987–1992 and 1996–1998 before it was permanently cancelled and all teams transferred into East Midlands/Leicestershire 3.

Original teams

When league rugby began in 1987, this division contained the following teams:

Antsey
Aylestonians
Birstall Community College
Burbage
New Parks Old Boys
Oakham

Leicestershire 2 honours

Leicestershire 2 (1987–1992)

The original Leicestershire 2 was a tier 9 league.  Promotion was to Leicestershire 1 and there was no relegation. At the end of the 1991–92 season all of the East Midlands and Leicestershire leagues were merged and the majority of sides in Leicestershire 2 transferred to the new East Midlands/Leicestershire 3.

Leicestershire 2 (1996-1998)

After an absence of four seasons Leicestershire 2 was reintroduced, this time sitting at tier 11 of the league system.  Promotion was to Leicestershire 1 and there was no relegation.  Remerging of all the East Midlands and Leicestershire leagues meant that Leicestershire 2 was cancelled at the end of the 1997–98 season and all teams transferred into East Midlands/Leicestershire 3.

Number of league titles

Aylestonians (1)
Braunstone Town (1)
Burbage (1)
New Parks Old Boys (1)
Oakham (1)
Old Ashbeians (1)
Old Newtonians (1)

Notes

See also
Leicestershire 1
Midlands RFU
Leicestershire RU
English rugby union system
Rugby union in England

References

External links
Leicestershire Rugby Union website

Defunct rugby union leagues in England
Rugby union in Leicestershire
Sports leagues established in 1987
Sports leagues disestablished in 1998